Craterodiscus is a genus of air-breathing land snail, a terrestrial pulmonate gastropod mollusk in the family Corillidae.

Species
Craterodiscus costulatus Stanisic, 2010
Craterodiscus pricei McMichael, 1959

References

 
Corillidae